Schacter is a surname. Notable people with the surname include:

Daniel Schacter (born 1952), American psychologist
Herschel Schacter (1917–2013), American Orthodox rabbi
Jacob J. Schacter (born 1950), American Orthodox rabbi
Jane S. Schacter (born 1958), American jurist

See also
Schechter